Magnate was a free men's lifestyle publication. It was published between 2012 and 2016.

History and profile
Originally a print publication, the magazine launched on 12 December 2012. The launch edition of the magazine was distributed on 14 December 2012 throughout London's Kings Cross, Victoria, Liverpool Street and Paddington Railway stations and throughout office locations in Central London. 

In mid-2013 it was announced that Magnate would be distributed exclusively to distribution stands in the capital, replacing all train station distribution. 

The publication launched with a cover-interview with Virgin founder Sir Richard Branson, speaking about Virgin Galactic. The headline of the cover read "Branson on Mars". Other cover-stars have included cast member of E4's Made in Chelsea Jamie Laing and British rapper Wretch 32.

Magnate published a number of interviews, including with Boris Johnson, SB.TV founder Jamal Edwards, Matt Cardle and Jonathan Kite. The magazine folded in 2016.

References

2012 establishments in the United Kingdom
2016 disestablishments in the United Kingdom
Defunct magazines published in the United Kingdom
Free magazines
Magazines established in 2012
Magazines disestablished in 2016
Magazines published in London
Men's magazines published in the United Kingdom
Online magazines published in the United Kingdom
Online magazines with defunct print editions
Quarterly magazines published in the United Kingdom